Shunkinsho, or A portrait of Shunkin is a film based on a short story by Jun'ichirō Tanizaki. It stars Momoe Yamaguchi and Tomokazu Miura. It was made in 1976. The director was Katsumi Nishikawa. It is one of a series of filmed love stories made starring Miura and Yamaguchi, who eventually married in real life.

Plot summary
Set in 19th-century Osaka, the film tells the story of a love affair between Sasuke (Miura) and blind koto teacher Shunkin (Yamaguchi), who lost her sight at the age of nine. Blindness gives Shunkin an extraordinary ability to masterfully play the traditional Japanese instruments of the three-stringed shamisen and thirteen-stringed sophisticated koto. She performs as a renowned musician and also gives music lessons. 

The film is also a psychological study of Shunkin and struggles of a young woman aware there is life out there she is never going to experience. Her life takes a turn when she accepts a young man (Sasuke) to teach him play music. He is both her student and a servant. Sasuke strives to please Shunkin in every possible way but irritates her when she discovers, he tries to play with eyes closed, since it reminds her about her defect. The two develop a unique a melancholic romantic relationship. Despite Shunkin's resistance the two are drawn to each other closer and closer. Shunkin is aware of Sasuke feelings, but does not want to accept them. However, subconsciously, she cannot live without his love anymore.

Shunkin suffers one more devastating tragedy when her face is burned with boiling water in her sleep by an assassin hired by a rejected suitor. Her beauty was a reason of the young woman pride and strength when dealing with her blindness and now even that was taken away from her. With her mutilated face she feels vulnerable, weak and scared of living her life. Her face is wrapped up in bandages. She forbids Sasuke to look at her anymore after the attack and does not want to show her scarred face to anyone. It is the time when their feelings become even stronger. They come to realization they cannot live without each other. Sasuke blinds himself to completely submerge into Shunkin's world and give her comfort that he never sees her other than a beautiful young woman. Shunkin ultimately surrenders to Sasukes' dedication and love and does not resist to openly loving him back any longer. They continue to live together and study and perform music together in complete harmony.

Cast
 Momoe Yamaguchi as Okoto
 Tomokazu Miura as Sasuke
 Ikue Sakakibara as Okichi
 Akira Nagoya as Zensuke
 Masahiko Tsugawa as Minoya

References

External links
 

1976 films
Films based on short fiction
Films based on works by Jun'ichirō Tanizaki
Films scored by Masaru Sato
1970s Japanese films